HMS Essex was a 64-gun third rate ship of the line of the Royal Navy, launched on 28 August 1760 at Rotherhithe.

In March 1762 Essex captured three small vessels:
Amis, a brig (1 March)
Esperance, a privateer of four guns, six swivel guns, and 45 men (6 March)
Bien Aimé, a privateer of four guns and 52 men (7 March)

Fate
Essex was on harbour service from 1777, and was sold out of the service in 1799.

Citations

References

Ships of the line of the Royal Navy
Essex-class ships of the line
1760 ships